Clarence Christensen Dall (1 September 1887 – 18 December 1953) was an Australian rules footballer for  in the Victorian Football League (VFL).

He later served in World War I.

References

1887 births
Australian rules footballers from New South Wales
Fitzroy Football Club players
Australian military personnel of World War I
1953 deaths